The 1898 Alabama gubernatorial election took place on August 1, 1898, in order to elect the governor of Alabama. Incumbent Democrat Joseph F. Johnston ran for a second term in office.

Results

References

1898
gubernatorial
Alabama
August 1898 events